Raymond Frederick Evans (8 October 1929 – 2005) was an English professional footballer who played in the Football League for Crewe Alexandra.

Career statistics
Source:

References

1929 births
2005 deaths
English footballers
Association football goalkeepers
English Football League players
Crewe Alexandra F.C. players
Stoke City F.C. players